Myślenice  is a town in southern Poland, situated in the Lesser Poland Voivodeship (since 1999), previously in Kraków Voivodeship (1975–1998). Population: 20,261 (2007). The town is divided into six districts. One of them, Zarabie, is a popular local tourist destination. It is located behind the Raba river (Zarabie meaning "Beyond the (River) Raba"), and it has Chełm mountain, with a view tower, a landscape park and ski lifts.

Myślenice is located on the so-called Zakopianka Road, which is a popular name of the European route E77 road, connecting Kraków with Zakopane (the E77 itself separates itself from the Zakopianka at Rabka). Myślenice does not have a train station.

History

First mentions of Myślenice come from 1253 - 1258. At that time, it was a defensive settlement, with a castle and fortifications, designed to protect Kraków from the south. In 1342, Myślenice received its Magdeburg rights town charter, and it started to develop into a local commercial center. Among visitors who came here, were Mikolaj Rej, who wrote part of his Life of an Honest Man during his stay there; King Władysław II Jagiełło and Queen Jadwiga; German emperor Sigismund; and other personalities.  In 1557, Myślenice came under the jurisdiction of Kraków castellans, who were much more concerned with their city. The town began to decline, and it was destroyed in the deluge. In 1772 (see Partitions of Poland), Myślenice was annexed by Austria, and until 1918, it belonged to the province of Galicia. After World War I, the town became part of the Second Polish Republic. On 22 January 1945, Myślenice was liberated by the troops of 38th Army of the 4th Ukrainian Front. Between 1975-1998 the city was part of the Kraków Voivodeship.

International relations

Twin towns — Sister cities
Myślenice is twinned with:

Sports 
 Dalin Myślenice - women's volleyball team that has won Polish Seria B Women's Volleyball League in 2003/2004 season and was promoted to play in Polish Seria A Women's Volleyball League in 2004/2005 season.
 CFL slotback Dave Stala was born here.

References

External links
 Jewish Community in Myślenice on Virtual Shtetl

Cities and towns in Lesser Poland Voivodeship
Myślenice County
Kraków Voivodeship (14th century – 1795)
Kingdom of Galicia and Lodomeria
Kraków Voivodeship (1919–1939)